Easton is a town in Fairfield County, Connecticut, United States. The population was 7,605 at the time of the 2020 census. Easton contains the historic district of Aspetuck and the Plattsville census-designated place. Part of the Greater Bridgeport area, which is in turn a part of the New York metropolitan statistical area, it is bordered by the towns of Fairfield, Connecticut  to the south, Redding to the north, Weston to the west, and Monroe and Trumbull to the east.

History
Easton was first settled in 1757 by men and women from Fairfield. In 1762 a congregation called the North Fairfield Society was established, and it gradually evolved into Easton. In 1787 Weston, then including lands now defined as Easton, was incorporated out of Fairfield. The area was slow to develop because of the rough hills along the Aspetuck River, and so it was not until 1845 that what is now Easton separated from Weston. Today, half of the town's property is owned by the Aquarion Water Company of Connecticut, the major supplier of water in the area.

The deaf and blind activist Helen Keller lived the last several years of her life in Easton. Her house is still intact today and has been owned by several families since her death. The local middle school is named for her.

The 2009 Rockefeller Center Christmas Tree was a  Norway Spruce donated from a private residence in Easton.

Geography

Demographics

As of the census of 2010, there were 7,490 people, 2,465 households, and 2,077 families residing in the town. The racial makeup of the town was 96.74% White, 0.22% African American, 0.04% Native American, 2.02% Asian, 0.01% Pacific Islander, 0.41% from other races, and 0.55% from two or more races. Hispanic or Latino of any race were 1.76% of the population.

Of the 2,465 households, 42.3% had children under the age of 18 living with them, 75.8% were married couples living together, 6.3% had a female householder with no husband present, and 15.7% were non-families. 12.4% of all households were made up of individuals, and 6.2% had someone living alone who was 65 years of age or older. The average household size was 2.95 and the average family size was 3.23 individuals.

In the town, the population was spread out, with 21.7% under the age of 18, 5.5% from 18 to 24, 24.7% from 25 to 44, 37% from 45 to 64, and 16.6% who were 65 years of age or older. The median age was 47 years. For every 100 females, there were 94.3 males. The sex ratio is 94.3 males per 100 females.

The median income for a household in the town was $132,000, and the median income for a family was $155,227. Males had a median income of $101,636 versus $83,333 for females. The per capita income for the town was $59,546. About 2.2% of families and 3.3% of the population were below the poverty line, including 3.4% of those under age 18 and 2.6% of those age 65 or over.

Arts and culture

Places listed on the National Register of Historic Places include Aspetuck Historic District, Ida Tarbell House, and Bradley-Hubbell House. The annual Easton Fireman's Carnival is an event run by the Easton Fire Department that occurs every summer. It features games and food in addition to rides provided by the Stewart Amusement Company. The carnival's proceeds help pay the yearly operating costs, improvements to house and equipment, and high priority gear. In 2020, the carnival was canceled for the first time in 63 years due to the COVID-19 pandemic.

Government

Historically, Easton has been a reliably Republican stronghold. However, in 2016, town residents voted for Democrat Hillary Clinton with a plurality. In 2020, Joe Biden improved upon the Democratic margin in the town.

2019 municipality election
Easton was seen as a shifting-liberal town in the wake of the 2019 municipality election. In the First Selectman election, Democrat David Bindelglass won, defeating Republican Wendy Bowditch. It was an upset, as Easton is known to be a solid-Republican stronghold.

Education

Easton has three schools: Samuel Staples Elementary school, for children in grades from kindergarten to 5th grade, Helen Keller Middle School, for children in grades 6 through 8, and the private school Easton Country Day for children K–12 (formerly Phoenix Academy). High school students attend Joel Barlow High School in Redding.

Media
Easton is served by multiple TV stations, notably WTNH, WFSB, WVIT, among many others. Easton is also served by New York City Metropolitan Area stations because the town is in that area.
Easton also is in the radius of many radio stations. Most notably WSHU, WFOX, WEBE, and WEZN.

Newspapers
Easton has many local newspapers of its own, but most of them are not well documented, with almost no info on them online. Despite this, these newspapers are printed and physical.

Easton Courier (1978–2018)

The Easton Courier began production in 1978. It was a print newspaper, different than its successor in 2020. It stopped publication in 2018 due to a lack of advertisements.

Easton Courier (2020–present)
The successor to the Easton Courier began work in 2018 after its closure. It began when Jim Castonguay, Director of the School of Communications, Media and the Arts at Sacred Heart University, reached out to former Easton Courier chief editor Nancy Doniger via LinkedIn, proposing the idea of a news publication created by students and faculty partnered up with the citizens of Easton. Local leaders embraced the idea after being presented with it. The newspaper began publication on February 29, 2020, as an online source with involvement from the town government. Since the newspaper is a nonprofit, it runs on donations from the public. An article asking for your donation remains continuously on the newspaper's website due to that fact. A new article about donations appeared on December 18, 2021, but it isn't continuously being featured.

Infrastructure

Emergency medical services
Easton Volunteer Emergency Medical Service was established in 1946 and currently has two ambulances, a staff of three Chief officers, two career technicians and 29 volunteers.

Fire department
Easton is protected by eight paid firefighters of the Easton Fire Department (EFD) and the volunteer firefighters of the Easton Volunteer Fire Company # 1. Founded in 1921, EFD operates out of one fire station, and runs an apparatus fleet of three engines, one attack engine, one haz-mat unit, one brush unit, and one command vehicle. The Easton Fire Department responds to over 500 emergency calls annually. In 2015, the fire department responded to 539 incidents.

Police department
The Easton Police Department includes a K9 unit, D.A.R.E, and an animal control unit. The Easton Police Explorer Post 2001 is an affiliated with the department. Easton Police are also first responders for all EMS calls in town. They are all certified EMR's or EMT's and can provide oxygen, perform basic first aid, and defibrillation.

Bridge
The Route 59 bridge in Easton, which carries more than 10,000 cars and trucks every day over the Mill River, has a substructure rated in critical condition by state safety inspectors. In 2007, the bridge was one of 12 in the southwestern part of the state with "critical" safety inspection ratings.

Bridge Construction
In 2019, construction was conducted on a South Park Avenue bridge over Mill River which ended in the summer of 2020. In May 2021, construction on another bridge on South Park Avenue began which ended in December of the same year.

Notable people

 Anne Baxter, actress
 Phoebe Brand, blacklisted actress
 Elise Broach, children's book author
 Morris Carnovsky, actor
 Hume Cronyn, actor
 Debrah Farentino, actress and journalist 
 Edna Ferber, playwright and novelist
 Eileen Fulton, TV actress
 Helen Keller, blind and deaf author; the town’s middle school is named in her honor
 Kevin Kilner, stage/television/movie actor
 Gary Mendell, founder of the national non-profit Shatterproof
 James Prosek, painter and author
 Dan Rather, CBS News anchor
 Igor Sikorsky, aircraft designer
 Jessica Tandy, actress
 Ida M. Tarbell, "muckraker" known for helping to break up the Standard Oil monopoly"
 Johnny Winter, blues guitarist

See also

 1807 Weston meteorite. Fell in portion of Weston which is now modern-day Easton

Notes

External links

Town of Easton official website
Historical Society of Easton official website
 "Living in: Easton, Conn.: A Town of Homes and Country Roads," by Eleanor Charles, an article in the Real Estate section of The New York Times, July 8, 2001

 
Towns in Fairfield County, Connecticut
Towns in the New York metropolitan area
Towns in Connecticut